The Nash Finch Company was a Fortune 500 company based in  Edina, Minnesota, United States. The company was involved in food distribution to private companies, primarily independent supermarkets, and military commissaries; and the operation of retail stores.

Spartan Stores announced its acquisition of Nash Finch in a $1.3 billion stock-swap in 2013.

History
The origins of the Nash Finch Company go back to 1885 when Fred Nash opened a small candy and tobacco shop in the Dakota Territory town of Devils Lake. Soon, Nash opened another store with his two brothers in Grand Forks, North Dakota. Edgar and Willis, the brothers, joined Fred in opening in the late 1880s a fruit distribution business. In 1899, the brothers added Harry Finch as an employee to sort lemons. The brother in 1904 made their first acquisition of a wholesale distributor in Minot, N.D., while Finch head up a Grand Forks, N.D. warehouse. Additional expansions occurs through 1912. A partnership was started with produce brokerage C.H. Robinson Company, which the company took control of. In 1919, the company moved to Minneapolis, Minnesota.

The brothers expanded into distribution with operations in Texas and California and had over 60 companies by 1921. In that year, the brother's companies were incorporated into the Nash Finch corporation. In 1922, the company starts selling Nash's Toasted Coffee and other products. Finch was appointed president in 1926. The company started its store brand, Our Family, in the 1930s.

In the 1950s, Nash Finch expanded its customer list to include corporate-owned chains to their existing independent mom-and-pop grocers. A 17-store supermarket chain was purchased in 1954. In St. Cloud, Minn., the company in 1964 starts Warehouse Market, a warehouse-style store.

In 1976, C.H. Robinson employees bought out Nash Finch becoming an employee owned company. Nash Finch is listed on the Nasdaq in 1983. The company bought M.H. McLean, a North Carolina-based. Thus expanding into the southeastern United States in 1984.

A Hispanic-themed grocery, Avanza, is opened by the company in 2002, while organic foods Family Fresh Market store is opened ind 2008. Three distribution centers are acquired by the military division in 2009. Two chains, No Frills stores and Bag 'N Save, were purchased in 2012 with 18 and 12 stores respectively.

Recent
In 2013, Spartan Stores and Nash Finch merged and formed SpartanNash company. The official name change was to occur May 2014, while continuing to operate as Spartan Stores, Nash Finch and MDV in their prior markets. Under terms of the $1.3 billion deal, each Nash share would convert to 1.2 shares of Spartan Stock. Spartan retained 57.7% of the combined company while Nash owns 42.3% of the approximately 38 million outstanding stock shares. Integration and transaction closing-related costs of approximately $17 million to $18 million will be recorded in the quarter ending December 28, 2013.

Operations
Nash Finch Company, headquartered in Edina, Minnesota (a Minneapolis suburb), was the second largest publicly traded wholesale food distributor in the United States, in terms of revenue, serving the retail grocery industry and the military commissary and exchange systems. Annual sales were approximately $5.21 billion.

The Company distributed food products and provides support services to a variety of retail formats including conventional supermarkets, military commissaries, multicultural stores and extreme value stores.

Nash Finch Company's core business, food distribution, served independent retailers and military commissaries in 36 states, the District of Columbia, Europe, Cuba, Puerto Rico, the Azores and Egypt.

Nash Finch also operated retail stores under the banners Avanza Supermarket, Bag 'N Save, Econofoods, Family Fresh Market, Family Thrift Center, No Frills Supermarkets (USA), Pick 'n Save, Prairie Market, SunMart Foods, Savers Choice, Wholesale Food Outlet, and Piggly Wiggly.

References

External links

Supermarkets of the United States
Companies based in Edina, Minnesota
Greater Grand Forks
Companies formerly listed on the Nasdaq